Alawwe Nandaloka Thero is a Sri Lankan politician and a former member of the Parliament of Sri Lanka. He replaced elected official Kolonnawe Sri Sumangala,  who resigned on 8 October 2004, six months after the Sri Lankan parliamentary election.

References

Year of birth missing (living people)
Living people
Members of the 13th Parliament of Sri Lanka
Jathika Hela Urumaya politicians
United People's Freedom Alliance politicians